William Francisco Araujo Ogonaga (born June 5, 1979) is an Ecuadorian footballer. He was part of the squad that won the 2008 Copa Libertadores.

Honors
L.D.U. Quito
Serie A: 2010
Copa Libertadores: 2008
Copa Sudamericana: 2009
Recopa Sudamericana: 2009, 2010

External links
Soccerway profile

References

1979 births
Living people
Footballers from Quito
Association football midfielders
Ecuadorian footballers
Ecuadorian Serie A players
C.D. El Nacional footballers
C.D. Cuenca footballers
C.D. ESPOLI footballers
Manta F.C. footballers
Deportivo Azogues footballers
L.D.U. Quito footballers
C.D. Técnico Universitario footballers